Larry Alan Tucker (November 11, 1935 – November 16, 2016) was an American politician.

Born in Carbondale, West Virginia, Tucker went to Montgomery High School. He then graduated from West Virginia University Institute of Technology. He served in the United States Army. Tucker served as the Democratic member of the West Virginia Senate from Nicholas County (12th District) from 1983 to 1989.

He resigned from office after pleading guilty in United States District Court to extortion.

In 2008, Tucker unsuccessfully challenged incumbent Tom Blankenship for the Democratic nomination for a seat on the Nicholas County Commission.

He died in Summersville, West Virginia on November 16, 2016.

References

1935 births
2016 deaths
Democratic Party West Virginia state senators
Presidents of the West Virginia State Senate
People from Fayette County, West Virginia
People from Nicholas County, West Virginia
West Virginia University Institute of Technology alumni
West Virginia politicians convicted of crimes